Casaglione is a commune in the Corse-du-Sud department of France on the island of Corsica.

Population

Sights
Torra di Capigliolu: a Genoese tower
Tremeca: dolmen

See also
Communes of the Corse-du-Sud department

References

Corse-du-Sud communes articles needing translation from French Wikipedia
Communes of Corse-du-Sud